IBM Operational Decision Manager (ODM) is IBM's Business Rule Management System (BRMS). IBM ODM also incorporates IBM's implementation of Business Event Processing capabilities (also called Complex Event Processing, or CEP.)

IBM ODM can be installed both independently and as an application running on WebSphere Application Server.

This software is currently in V8.11.0 (as of October 2022).

Business rules and events

Rules
A business rule is a statement of logic that is used for a business decision to be made. This statement of logic is generally part of a business policy. Rules processing involves a piece of software using this pre-defined rule to make a real-time decision.

Example 
A policy states that a borrower's initial loan must not exceed 3 times their annual salary.
The Business Rule would read:
if Loan > (Salary * 3) then disallow.

Events
A business event is a signal or collection of signals indicating that a change in state has occurred, and consists of a small message. Event processing involves using events to determine if an action needs to occur as a result, and carrying out that action.

Example 
If a customer's withdrawal event on their account causes the balance to drop below zero, then an action is taken to notify that customer.

Artifacts of IBM ODM
IBM ODM is an implementation of a Business Rule Management System. It allows the creation, management, testing and governance of business rules and events and stores them in a central repository where they can be accessed by multiple individuals and software products. This central storage of the rules and events mean that they can be easily modified without having to rebuild software, and with a reduced testing cycle, and the different software products will pick up this change simultaneously.

Action rules
A basic rule expressed in a logical form, stating that if a condition occurs then an action should result. IBM ODM uses Business Action Language (BAL) to define such rules, allowing them to be viewed in a more 'natural' language.

Examples 

If a credit card transaction occurs outside a customer's country, then that customer should be called to confirm the card is not being used fraudulently.
If Country of Card Usage is not equal to Customer's home country then trigger the sending of a message to call that customer.

At a bank some customers are not allowed to become overdrawn and some are:
If a customer tries to withdraw funds allowing their account to drop below $0 and they are allowed:
permit transaction
otherwise:
disallow transaction

Decision tables
Decision table

Example 

A loan company determines the insurance rate of a loan depending on the amount, and the credit rating of the customer.

Presented with a customer in group B asking for a loan of $250,000, the rule would indicate the insurance rate should be 0.002%.

Rule flows
These indicate the order in which rules should be executed.

Example 

An insurance company wants to establish whether a driver should be given a particular insurance policy. 
The decision depends on:

The age of the applicant
Whether their history indicates they are a high risk driver, based on speeding tickets and past accidents.
A profile score of that customer, based on how recently they have passed their test and other factors.

Whether a particular rule is run is dependent on answers to previous rules.

A rule flow is constructed, from a start node to the different rules that must be considered and finishing at the end node.

Score card
This is a statistical model that applies a numerical score to an object, such as a customer or an account. The same attributes are applied when calculating this score for each item.
An example of this is a Credit scorecards.

Example 

A score is allocated to a borrower depending on their Age, Citizenship and Credit grade.

Events
If a specific change in state occurs then a message is emitted causing an event to occur.

Example
At a bank some customers are not allowed to become overdrawn and some are. A customer who has tried to take out a loan is refused by the system because their credit rating is too low.
If customer is refused, emit an event causing a message to be sent to the user informing them that they have been refused in indicating the reason.

In summary
Combining Business Rules and Events within the same system brings together two complementary technologies to automate real-time decisions. An event may trigger a rule to be run, conversely the outcome of a decision made by a rule may emit an event.

Components
IBM ODM consists of the following parts:

Decision center
This provides a repository and management component for the creation and maintenance of decision logic, guiding the business system's behavior. It is the central hub for the coordination of the decision life cycle, covering both business rules and business events, and allowing editing of each. 
It is presented in different ways depending on how the user is intended to view the system.
Business Console, for collaboratively working with business rules.
Enterprise Console.

Decision server
This consists of the runtime components for business rules and business events.

Decision server rules
This provides a group of tools for construction and running of rules and automated decisions. Various components give access for different types of users, allowing the design, authoring, review, testing and running of business rules. This includes the Rules Designer, an Eclipse-based application for developing applications in Decision Server Rules.

Decision server events
This provides an integrated set of components for running events. Various components give access for different types of users, allowing the design, development, testing, deployment and maintenance of business events. This includes the Events Designer, an Eclipse-based application for developing applications in Decision Server Events.

Connection between parts
Rules can be defined in the Decision Center and can also be updated there, using a variety of interfaces, including the Enterprise Console, Business Console. Rules are then stored in a Repository which manages the Decision Artifacts, access and control and versioning. From here the rules are deployed to the Decision Server, which executes these rules, and provides monitoring and measuring facilities. Rules can also be deployed direct to the Decision Server using the Rule Designer or Event Designer.

Requirements
Decision Server Rules can run on distributed systems:
On WebSphere Application Server
WebSphere Application Server ND
On WebSphere Application Server Express
On Tomcat
On JBoss application server
On JBoss Enterprise Application Platform
On WebLogic Server 
As a shared or scoped Java EE application

Decision Server Rules can run on the z/OS mainframe:
Standalone (as Rule Execution Server for z/OS)
On WebSphere Application Server for z/OS
On WebSphere Application Server ND for z/OS

Decision Server Events and Decision Center can run on 
WebSphere Application Server for z/OS
WebSphere Application Server ND for z/OS

Rules Designer is run in Eclipse, or an Eclipse-based product

Supported platforms
Hardware and software requirements

Version history
Prior to its release at V7.5, the parts of ODM were available as separate products:
 ILOG JRules, coming from the acquisition of ILOG
 WebSphere Business Events, coming from the acquisition of Aptsoft.

Websites claiming or suggesting that ODM is a notable piece of software
Technology Blog
James Taylor on Everything Decision Management

References

IBM Websphere Business Events
IBM WebSphere
WebSphere Application Server
WebSphere Application Server for z/OS

External links
 IBM ODM
 IBM ODM Marketplace
 WebSphere Operation Decision Management Whitepaper
 IBM ODM V8.5 Information Center
 Linked In 
 How to manage change
 Making Better Decisions Using IBM WebSphere Operational Decision Management
 Flexible Decision Automation for Your zEnterprise with Business Rules and Events (Draft of V8.0.1 update)
 Flexible Decision Automation for Your zEnterprise with Business Rules and Events
 WebSphere Software
 World Wide WebSphere User Group
 BodyMedia Selects IBM Software
 ODM Accelerator for IBM Operational Decision Manager

Operational Decision Management
Business software